Pierregot (Pièrgou in Picard) is a commune in the Somme department in Hauts-de-France in northern France.

Geography

Mayors
Daniel Sauvet (2008–2014)
Gérard Philippe (2001–2008)

Population

See also
Communes of the Somme department

References

Communes of Somme (department)